The 1967 Nebraska Cornhuskers football team was the representative of the University of Nebraska and member of the Big Eight Conference in the 1967 NCAA University Division football season. The team was coached by Bob Devaney and played their home games at Memorial Stadium in Lincoln, Nebraska.

Schedule

Roster

Depth chart

Coaching staff

Game summaries

Washington

Minnesota

Kansas State

Kansas

Colorado

TCU

Iowa State

Oklahoma State

Missouri

Oklahoma

Rankings

After the season

Awards
 UPI Big 8 Player of the Year: Wayne Meylan
 All American: Wayne Meylan
 All American Honorable Mention: Barry Alvarez, Dick Davis, Jim McCord, Marv Mueller, Dennis Richnafsky, Bob Taucher
 All Big 8: Dick Davis, Jim McCord, Wayne Meylan, Dennis Richnafsky
 All Big 8 2nd Team: Barry Alvarez, Dick Davis, Jim McCord, Marv Mueller, Bob Taucher
 All Big 8 Honorable Mention: Ken Geddes, Ben Gregory, Roger Kudrna, Dennis Morrison, Joe Orduna, Frank Patrick

Future professional players
 Dick Davis, 1969 12th-round pick of the Cleveland Browns
Ken Geddes, 1970 7th-round pick of the Detroit Lions
 Ben Gregory, 1968 5th-round pick of the Buffalo Bills
 James Hawkins, 1969 7th-round pick of the Los Angeles Rams
 Bob Liggett, 1970 15th-round pick of the Kansas City Chiefs
Wayne Meylan, 1968 4th-round pick of the Cleveland Browns
Frank Patrick, 1970 10th-round pick of the Green Bay Packers
 Glenn Patterson, 1970 17th-round pick of the Dallas Cowboys
 Dana Stephenson, 1970 8th-round pick of the Chicago bears
 Bob Taucher, 1968 7th-round pick of the Dallas Cowboys
 Mike Wynn, 1970 8th-round pick of the Oakland Raiders

References

Nebraska
Nebraska Cornhuskers football seasons
Nebraska Cornhuskers football